The Copa Campeonato Primera División (familiarly known as Superfinal) was an official Argentine football cup competition organized by the Argentine Football Association. It was played in a single match format between the Torneo Inicial and Torneo Final champions.

History 
Originally awarded to Primera División champions, the trophy is the oldest in Argentine football, having been awarded for the first time in 1896, three years after the Argentine Football Association was established, and played without interruption until 1926. The Cup received several names, such as "Championship Cup", "Copa Campeonato", "Challenge Cup" and "Copa Alumni", due to the association offered legendary team Alumni to keep the Cup definitely for having won it three consecutive times (1900–02), but the club from Belgrano declined the honour to keep the trophy under dispute.

On June, 2013, the association decided to put the trophy back into circulation with the creation of a new competition, named "Superfinal" that consisted in a single match between winners of Torneo Inicial and Torneo Final, played in a neutral venue.

The first edition of the competition was awarded as a Primera División league title so Vélez Sársfield achieved its 10th league championship after defeating Newell's Old Boys, but the association then changed the rules, deciding that the competition would not count as a Primera División title but a domestic cup since its second edition.

Due to the 2015 and 2016 seasons were played as single tournaments with only one champion per season, the Copa Campeonato has not held since then.

Champions

Notes

References

C